The fifth competition weekend of the 2010–11 ISU Speed Skating World Cup was held in the Meiji Hokkaido-Tokachi Oval in Obihiro, Japan, on 11–12 December 2010.

Schedule of events
The schedule of the event is below:

Medal summary

Men's events

Women's events

References

5
Isu World Cup, 2010-11, 5
Sport in Hokkaido